hey you. yes you. is the fourth studio album by Australian musician Ben Lee, released in November 2002.  The album peaked at number 45 on the ARIA charts.

The single, "Something Borrowed, Something Blue", was voted #22 in the Triple J Hottest 100, 2002.

Track listing
"Running with Scissors" – 3:32
"Aftertaste" – 3:16
"Dirty Mind" – 4:15
"Something Borrowed, Something Blue" – 4:02
"Run" – 3:31
"Chills" – 3:26
"Music 4 the Young & Foolish" – 3:15
"No Room to Bleed" – 3:48
"On and On" – 3:59
"Shine" – 4:08
"In the Morning" – 3:00
"Still on the Line" – 5:37

Charts

References

Ben Lee albums
2002 albums
Modular Recordings albums
Albums produced by Dan the Automator